The Edmonton Oilers are a Canadian professional ice hockey team based in Edmonton, Alberta. They play in the Pacific Division of the Western Conference in the National Hockey League (NHL). The Oilers where established in 1972 as part of the World Hockey Association (WHA) and joined the NHL as one of four franchises during the 1979 NHL expansion. There have been 23 head coaches in their franchise history; seven during their time in the WHA (1972–1979) and seventeen during their time in the NHL (1979-present).

The Oilers had seven different head coaches during the seven seasons that they played in the WHA. Ray Kinasewich was the first head coach for over 30 games of the original Alberta Oilers, with Hall of Famer (and Top
100 Players of All Time) Glenn Hall as the teams first Assistant Coach. Bill Hunter, who was the team's owner and general manager at the time served three terms. Glen Sather became a player-coach during the 1976–77 season, but retired as a player at the end of the year. Sather then coached the team for two more seasons in the WHA, and maintained the position when the Oilers were admitted as an expansion franchise into the NHL.

Since joining the NHL for the 1979–80 season, the Oilers have had twelve different head coaches. Sather has the most games coached and most wins as head coach. Sather stepped down before the 1980–81 season, but after the Oilers started the season with only four wins in their first eighteen games he returned to the bench. Sather remained head coach for the remainder of that season plus eight more seasons, during which time the team won four Stanley Cups, in 1984, 1985, 1987 and 1988. For the 1985–86 NHL season, Sather won the Jack Adams Award for the NHL coach "adjudged to have contributed the most to his team's success". Sather stepped down as coach a second time after the 1988–89 season, and John Muckler coached the 1990 championship team. Sather would have one more stint as head coach, relieving Ted Green after the team posted just three victories in the first 24 games of the 1993–94 season. Sather was inducted into the Hockey Hall of Fame in 1997 in the builder category.

Former Oilers head coach, Craig MacTavish, played for the team from 1985–94.  He was a member of the 1987, 1988, and 1990 Stanley Cup winning teams, and he was team captain from 1992–1994.  As of the 2013–14 season, he ranks second in the number of Oilers games coached.

The current head coach is Jay Woodcroft.

Key

Win % and Pts %
Win–loss percentage =  and Points percentage = 
For the 1999–2000 to 2003–04 seasons, an extra point was awarded for overtime losses.  These totals are included as losses for the purpose of calculating win–loss percentage.
Since the 2005–06 NHL season, ties are no longer recorded, but single points for overtime or shootout losses are still awarded.  These totals are included as ties for the purpose of calculating win–loss percentage.

Coaches

WHA

NHL

Notes

References

Sources

Edmonton Oilers head coaches
 
head coaches